Holacanthella is a genus of giant springtails in the family Neanuridae, found only in New Zealand. Up to 17 mm in length, they are the largest springtails in the world.

Description 
Holacanthella species are usually dark bluish-grey in colour, with distinctive brightly-coloured spine-like projections (called digitations) on their skin. The digitations range in colour from dark to white to yellow to red, even within a single species like H. paucispinosa, in which different colour morphs occur side by side and vary geographically.

Most Collembola are only 1–3 mm in length, but Holcanthella average 6–10 mm, and some individuals of H. duospinosa have been recorded as reaching 17 mm, making them the largest known species of springtail. Unlike most springtails, Holacanthella lack a furcula and cannot jump.

Distribution 
Holacanthella are decomposers, relying on rotting hardwood logs for food. They have been recorded only from indigenous native bush in New Zealand, preferring diverse, mature forest that has never been logged. They appear to be absent from regrown forest, possibly because they are poor at recolonising former habitats; their presence may in fact be an indicator of forest health.

Species
 Holacanthella spinosa (Lubbock, 1899)
 Holacanthella paucispinosa (Salmon, 1941)
 Holacanthella brevispinosa (Salmon, 1942)
 Holacanthella duospinosa (Salmon, 1942)
 Holacanthella laterospinosa (Salmon, 1944)

References

External links 
 Holacanthella discussed on RNZ Critter of the Week, 10 November 2017

Neanuridae
Endemic fauna of New Zealand
Springtail genera
Endemic arthropods of New Zealand